Giuseppe Barberi (1746-1809) was an Italian architect, though he first trained as a silversmith.

Legacy

His work is held in several museums, including the Cooper-Hewitt, National Design Museum, the University of Michigan Museum of Art, the Morgan Library & Museum, and the Metropolitan Museum of Art.

References

1746 births
1809 deaths
18th-century Italian architects
19th-century Italian architects